The Central School was a school building in Martins Ferry, Ohio, United States.  Located at the corner of South 4th and Hickory Streets, the school was listed on the National Register of Historic Places on July 23, 1979.  It is no longer on the Register: the designation was removed on February 21, 1980, less than a year after it was added.  Designed by Benjamin Exley and C.H. Owsley, it was built in 1897 in the Richardsonian Romanesque style of architecture.

The building was demolished to make room for the Citizens National Bank, the current owners.

References

School buildings completed in 1897
Buildings and structures in Belmont County, Ohio
National Register of Historic Places in Belmont County, Ohio
Former National Register of Historic Places in Ohio
School buildings on the National Register of Historic Places in Ohio
Romanesque Revival architecture in Ohio
Neoclassical architecture in Ohio
1897 establishments in Ohio